Justice Gale may refer to:

 Christopher Gale (1670–1735), chief justice of the Colony of North Carolina
 George Alexander Gale (1906–1997), chief justice for the province of Ontario
 William H. Gale (fl. 1860s), associate justice of the Colorado Territorial Supreme Court